Rustam Boborakhimovich Yatimov ((), born 13 July 1998) is a Russian-born naturalized Tajik professional football player who plays for FC Istiklol.

Career

Club
On 26 February 2016, Nizhny Novgorod registered Yatimov to senior squad for the remainder of the 2015–16 season.

On 24 February 2017, FC Istiklol announced the signing of Yatimov on a five-year contract. On 5 July 2017, Yatimov was released by Istiklol by mutual consent citing his desire to return to a team in Russia. On 23 July 2018, Yatimov returned to Istiklol, signing a contract until the end of 2020.

International
Yatimov made his senior team debut on 7 June 2019 in a 1-1 draw against Afghanistan.

Career statistics

Club

International

Statistics accurate as of match played 25 September 2022

Honors
Istiklol
 Tajikistan Higher League (5): 2018, 2019, 2020, 2021, 2022

 Tajikistan Cup (3): 2018, 2019, 2022
 Tajik Supercup (4): 2019, 2020, 2021, 2022

Tajikistan
King's Cup: 2022

References

External links
 

1998 births
Living people
Tajikistani footballers
Tajikistan international footballers
FC Istiklol players
Association football goalkeepers
Tajikistan Higher League players
Tajikistan youth international footballers